Future Tense was a weekly 30-minute Irish radio programme which aired on RTÉ Radio 1. Presented by Ella McSweeney, the show focused on issues in science and technology.

References

RTÉ Radio 1 programmes